Hosfeld is a surname. Notable people with the surname include:

Rolf Hosfeld (born 1948), Academic Director of the Potsdam Lepsius House in Germany
 (borm 1960), American composer